The 2022 World Touring Car Cup was the fifth and final season of the World Touring Car Cup and 18th overall of the series, which dates back to the 2005 World Touring Car Championship. The season began on 7 May at the Circuit de Pau-Ville and ended on 27 November in Jeddah Corniche Circuit, however multiple event cancellations due to the Russian invasion of Ukraine and ongoing quarantine restrictions in Asia. On 1st September 2022, the organiser announced the final version of the calendar, adding Bahrain and Saudi Arabia as final venues for the 2022 season.

The season was marred by issues with tyres as drivers suffered numerous tyre failures on several rounds. These led to the cancellation of the races at the Nürburgring and Cyan Racing withdrawing from the series midway through the year. Only nine drivers completed the full season.

On 14th October 2022, the organiser announced that after five seasons of running under the WTCR guise, the series will end in its current format following the conclusion of the current season, which had two rounds remaining in Bahrain (10–12 November) and Saudi Arabia (25–27 November).

Teams and drivers

Summary 
 JAS Motorsport and Honda Racing retained their 2021 drivers – Attila Tassi, Tiago Monteiro, Néstor Girolami and Esteban Guerrieri – for the 2022 season but on 15 January it was announced that Engstler Motorsport will switch from Hyundai to Honda.
 Mikel Azcona will switch from Zengő Motorsport Services KFT to BRC Hyundai N Lukoil Squadra Corse to replace Gabriele Tarquini.
 2020 TCR China Touring Car Championship winner Ma Qing Hua returned to the series after having last raced in 2019 for Team Mulsanne, driving a car for Cyan Performance Lynk & Co.
 2020 TCR Europe Touring Car Series winner Mehdi Bennani returned to the series and Comtoyou Racing after having last raced in 2019 for SLR VW Motorsport to replace last season's runner-up Frédéric Vervisch.
 Dániel Nagy returned to the series and Zengő Motorsport after having last taken part in the series in 2018, to replace Bence Boldizs.

Mid-season changes 
 Cyan Racing withdrew from the Race of Italy, citing tire safety concerns. Cyan Racing would later suspend their WTCR program with immediate effect for the same reason in August 2022 and not see out the season.

Calendar
The preliminary race calendar was published by the championship management on 26 November 2021. On 26 February 2022, WTCR Race of Russia was suspended due to the ongoing Russian invasion of Ukraine. On 19 March 2022, the calendar was updated again with the cancellation of the Czech and Russian rounds. A further update was ratified on 14 April 2022, with the addition of two rounds at Vallelunga and Anneau du Rhin. Another update was made on 29 June 2022 by cancelling Asian rounds due to the logistical challenges and quarantine restrictions in Asia: An update was provided on 1 September 2022 by adding races in Bahrain and Saudi Arabia to host the final rounds of the championship.

The following rounds were cancelled due to the ongoing Russian invasion of Ukraine and logistical challenges in Asia:

Compensation weight handicaps
Compensation weight handicaps were given to the participating cars based on their best qualifying lap times in the previous two events, with 40 kg being the maximum penalty. Hyundai customer team BRC Racing Team was in particular noted to have gamed the system by intentionally performing worse than possible in qualifying to avoid being penalised.

Results

Championship standings
Scoring system

Scoring system for WTCR Trophy

Drivers' championship

Teams' championship

WTCR Trophy
Eligible for drivers racing without manufacturer support.

Notes

References

External links
 

World
WTCR
2022
Sports events affected by the 2022 Russian invasion of Ukraine